Thomas Jones (died 8 October 1711) was a Member of Parliament for East Grinstead, Sussex in 1685. A son of a judge, he was a nominee of Charles Sackville, 6th Earl of Dorset in the two-member constituency, and was opposed by the Tory John Conyers. Conyers complained of the election to Parliament, in May 1685, but nothing was done with his petition.

References

English MPs 1685–1687
17th-century births
1711 deaths
Year of birth missing